Hunyadiscus saurini is a species of air-breathing land snails, a terrestrial pulmonate gastropod mollusc in the family Plectopylidae. 

The specific name saurini is in honour of French geologist and malacologist Edmond Saurin (1904–1977), who collected type material. Saurin's type material is as of 2016 the only known material of this species.

Distribution
The distribution of Hunyadiscus saurini includes Laos.

The type locality is "Laos, Pa Hia (Ancienne province Tran Ninh)".

References

External links
 Páll-Gergely B., Muratov I.V. & Asami T. (2016). The family Plectopylidae (Gastropoda, Pulmonata) in Laos with the description of two new genera and a new species. ZooKeys. 592: 1-26.
 Páll-Gergely, B. (2018). Systematic revision of the Plectopylinae (Gastropoda, Pulmonata, Plectopylidae). European Journal of Taxonomy. (455): 1–114
 Inkhavilay, K., Sutcharit, C., Bantaowong, U., Chanabun, R., Siriwut, W., Srisonchai, R., Pholyotha, A., Jirapatrasilp, P. & Panha, S. (2019). Annotated checklist of the terrestrial molluscs from Laos (Mollusca, Gastropoda). ZooKeys. 834: 1–166.

Plectopylidae
Gastropods described in 2016